Dome Petroleum Limited was a Calgary-based oil and gas company. Founded in 1950 as a subsidiary of the Toronto company Dome Mines Limited, Dome was built by Jack Gallagher, who remained with the company until 1983. In 1988 Dome was purchased by Amoco.

History

Jack Gallagher joined a group of investors in Dome Exploration (Western) Ltd. in 1950 and built it into the major Canadian oil company Dome Petroleum Limited (to which it was renamed in 1958). Gallagher was the sole employee for the first two years. However, James McCrea, who was instrumental in building Dome Mines into one of the giants of the Canadian mining industry, is credited with originally creating Dome Exploration (Western) Ltd. Charles Dunkley was Dome's third employee and became Dome's Senior Vice President and Jack's management partner. "Charlie" had a  reserved management style and the pair worked well together especially in the early days when they ran a tight management ship.

Dome grew by making acquisitions in the energy industry, notably the 1981 acquisition of a 52.9% interest of Hudson's Bay Oil and Gas Company (HBOG) through its wholly owned subsidiary, Dome Energy Limited. Dome was active mainly in Western Canada, the Beaufort Sea and the Arctic islands. The company developed serious problems as a result of the 1986 drop in world oil prices and substantial debts from past takeovers. In November 1987, after months of negotiation, an agreement in principle was reached that led to Amoco Canada Petroleum Co Ltd buying Dome for $5.5 billion. This purchase was completed 1 September 1988.

Upon his death, Gallagher was recognized as a masterful lobbyist and a pioneering, if controversial, figure in the history of Canadian energy development.

Leadership

President 
John E. P. Gallagher, 1950–1974
William E. Richards, 1974–1983
John M. Beddome, 1983–1988

Chairman of the Board 
Clifford W. Michel, 1950–1974
John E. P. Gallagher, 1974–1983
J. Howard Macdonald, 1983–1988

References

Prisoners of Debt: Inside the Global Banking Crisis. Directed by Robert Collison and Peter Raymont. National Film Board, 1983.
Foster, Peter. Other People's Money: The Banks, the Government and Dome. Don Mills: Harper Collins, 1983.
Lyon, Jim. Dome: The Rise and Fall of the House that Jack Built. Toronto: MacMillan, 1983.
Amoco
Companies based in Calgary
Companies disestablished in 1988
Defunct energy companies of Canada
Non-renewable resource companies established in 1950
Defunct companies of Canada
Defunct oil and gas companies of Canada
Defunct oil companies
History of Alberta
History of Calgary
Oil and gas companies
Oil companies of Canada
1950 establishments in Alberta
1988 mergers and acquisitions
1988 disestablishments in Alberta